The Blue Jean County Queen is a festival run by Meath Macra na Feirme that has taken place over the June Bank Holiday weekend in Athboy, Co. Meath since 1987.

History
In 1987, Patrick Farrelly a member of Macra na Feirme from Carnaross was inspired the song "Blue Jean Country Queen" by Linda Hargrove to create the festival. Since its inception, it has been run by Meath Macra na Feirme taken place in the town of Athboy, Co. Meath. Although in 2001 the festival was postponed due to the outbreak of foot and mouth disease.

The closure of The Old Darnley Lodge Hotel in 2013, which was the venue for much of the weekends activity, resulted in the festival organizers having to put together alternative arrangements for housing many of the events. The hotel re-opened under new management the festival returned there the following year.

The festival verged on moving to the nearby town of Navan in 2014. However a set of lucrative sponsorship offers from local businesses as well as Athboy Credit Union was enough to guarantee the festival remained in Athboy.

The 2020 Festival was due to be headlined by The Blizzards and Jake Carter. However, the event was cancelled due to the COVID-19 pandemic. The organizing committee chose to mark the June Bank Holiday weekend with "The Blue Jean Country Stream" a nostalgic look back at previous festivals featuring clips from through the festival's 30-year history was broadcast over social media. 

In 2021, with the festival again postponed due to the on-going COVID-19 pandemic, Blue Jean Country Queen Aoife Scanlon embarked on a fundraising campaign in aid of the Irish Cancer Society.

The festival is set to return in June 2023.

Contestants

The girls who participate in the competition are either members of Macra na Feirme, or a similar rural youth organisation in the case of overseas contestants.  There is also a contestant from the Autonne Villages in France whom Athboy are twinned with. Each contestant will have gone through an interview at their own county/regional level in order to be chosen to compete at the festival. Over the weekend the girls are interviewed on stage by a celebrity and also by a panel of judges. Celebrity interviewers have included Ray D'Arcy, Brendan Grace, Darragh McCullough and Hector Ó hEochagáin.

Events
The festival is made up of several events that run from the Friday before the June Bank Holiday to the Bank Holiday Monday itself. The events include:

Friday 
The Queens arrive and are interviewed on stage.

Saturday 
A Craft Fair, followed by a Street Carnival featuring music, dancing, and face painting which is topped off by the Queens performing karaoke. Later that evening is the Queen's pub crawl followed by the first event in the Festival Marquee usually a band.

Sunday 
The Fair Green in Athboy plays host to family entertainment including music, entertainment, sideshows and the Queens engaging in a game of Fancy Dress Football and a fashion show. That evening the Banquet takes place which leads to the announcement of the winning Queen at midnight.

Monday 
A music session takes place in the Darnley Lodge Hotel.

Previous Winners

See also
Macra na Feirme
Queen of the Land Festival

References

External Links
 
 Blue Jean Country Queen Festival on Facebook

Festivals in Ireland
Entertainment events in Ireland
Beauty pageants in Ireland
 County Meath
Leinster
Summer events in the Republic of Ireland
1987 establishments in Ireland